{{Infobox person
| name          = Michael Graves
| image         = Michael Graves-4.jpg
| alt           =
| caption       = Graves in 2016
| birth_name    =
| birth_date    = 
| birth_place   =
| nationality   = 
| other_names   = 
| alma_mater    =
| occupation    = Mastering engineer
| years_active  = 1998-present
| known_for     =
| notable_works =
| awards        = Grammy Award for Best Historical Album:
It's Such A Good Feeling: The Best Of Mister Rogers (2021)
Voices of Mississippi: Artists and Musicians Documented by William Ferris (2018)
Hank Williams, The Garden Spot Programs, 1950 (2014)
Art of Field Recording Volume I: Fifty Years of Traditional American Music Documented by Art Rosenbaum (2008)
9 other nominations<p>Blues Music Award, Historical Album of the Year: Bobby Rush, Chicken Heads: A 50-Year History Of Bobby Rush (2017)
| spouse        =
| website       = osirisstudio.com
}}
Michael Graves (born December 23, 1968) is an American mastering engineer. He specializes in audio restoration and audio preservation. Graves is a four-time Grammy award-winner and a thirteen-time Grammy nominee. He is widely considered one of the best audio engineers in his field. Country singer Hank Williams' daughter Jett praised Graves' work on her father's Grammy-winning album The Garden Spot Programs, 1950, calling it "the best restoration I’ve ever heard before, the 1% of 1% of restoration engineering."

Graves has worked on a wide variety of archival musical projects, working with clients from around the world.  Graves' main focus is historical audio that was recorded on deteriorating or obsolete media, as well as more recent recordings on which the sound is obscured for various reasons, utilizing tools and techniques to restore the original audio. His work has often been compared to that of an archaeologist because of Graves' similarly painstaking process of cleaning and restoring old and often damaged archival material. He works with such record labels as Dust-to-Digital, Analog Africa, The Numero Group and Omnivore Recordings, which specialize in historical recordings. He has also remastered recordings for commercial release by artists such as Hank Williams, Ray Charles, Joni Mitchell, Big Star, Blondie, Richard Hell, Janis Joplin, Stax Records, Nina Simone, Erroll Garner, Buck Owens and Bobby Rush.

Graves owns and operates Osiris Studio, a Los Angeles-based mastering and audio-restoration services facility that provides audio services to the entertainment and archival communities. The studio is named after the Egyptian god of resurrection, reflecting Graves' interest in bringing recordings "back to life."

Early life 
Graves grew up in Texas. He began collecting records from a young age, taking advantage of his father's free travel perks as a Delta Air Lines employee to visit record stores across the U.S. and Europe.

He graduated from Georgia State University.

Career
Graves spent the early part of his career in Atlanta. He first became interested in audio restoration after receiving an early CD recorder as a gift in 1998. In the course of digitizing some rare records in his vinyl collection, he became interested in the possibilities of digital audio restoration.

In 2002, Graves founded Osiris Studio, initially working with private collectors to digitize and restore their music collections. In 2003, Graves was hired by Georgia State University to help digitize and preserve a substantial portion of its Johnny Mercer collection, one of the world's largest collections of commercial, home and unreleased recordings relating to noted songwriter Mercer. Graves continued working for Georgia State University, preserving assets in GSU's Southern Labor Archives.

Graves subsequently expanded his business, performing preservation services for the audio archives of such institutions as the National Park Service (Great Smoky Mountains, Joshua Tree, Sitka and Yosemite archives), Archives of the Episcopal Church, the Coca-Cola Company, Sacred Harp Publishing Company Archives, and the Centers for Disease Control's David J. Sencer CDC Museum.

In 2005, Graves met Steven Lance Ledbetter, co-owner of Dust-to-Digital, an influential Atlanta-based record label that specializes in documenting the history of American popular music, including historical recordings of blues, gospel and country music. Dust-to-Digital hired Graves to restore and master the recordings collected on its archival box set Fonotone Records: Frederick, Maryland (1956-1969). That project marked the beginning of a long-running collaboration between Graves and Dust-to-Digital, with Graves restoring and mastering the majority of the label's releases thereafter.

Graves won his first Grammy award in 2009, for his work on Dust-to-Digital's four-CD box set Art of Field Recording, Vol. I: 50 Years of Traditional American Music Documented by Art Rosenbaum. The set won in the category of Best Historical Album, with Graves, as mastering engineer, sharing the award with the album's producers, Ledbetter and Art Rosenbaum.

In 2011, Graves began working with the archival label Analog Africa, restoring and mastering a large portion of that company's catalog, beginning with the album Bambara Mystic Soul: The Raw Sound of Burkina Faso 1974-1979.

Graves received a second Grammy nomination in 2012, for the Dust-to-Digital release Opika Pende: Africa at 78 RPM. The following year, he was nominated for another Dust-to-Digital project, Pictures of Sound: One Thousand Years of Educed Audio: 980-1980.

In 2013, after meeting company co-founder Cheryl Pawelski, Graves began a long-running relationship with the reissue label Omnivore Recordings. Graves' first project for Omnivore was his restoration of a set of 1950 Hank Williams recordings for the Garden Spot radio program. The resulting album, The Garden Spot Programs, won Graves his second Grammy award, again in the  Best Historical Album category.

The same year, Graves was also nominated in the Grammy category of Best Historical Album for his work on the Dust-to-Digital release Longing for the Past: The 78 RPM Era in Southeast Asia.

In 2015, Graves assumed mastering and restoration duties for the compilation CD that accompanies the Oxford American magazine's annual music issue.

Graves earned a 2015 Grammy nomination, again in the Best Historical Album category, for his work on Dust-to-Digital's 2014 release Parchman Farm: Photographs and Field Recordings 1947-1959. This was followed by a 2016 Grammy nomination, for another Dust-to-Digital album, Music of Morocco: Recorded by Paul Bowles (Dust-to-Digital). Graves received two Best Historical Album Grammy nominations the following year, for Washington Phillips and His Manzarene Dreams (Dust-to-Digital) and Sweet As Broken Dates: Lost Somali Tapes from the Horn of Africa (Ostinato).

In 2018, Graves moved Osiris Studio to Los Angeles, where he has continued to work on a wide variety of archival releases. The same year, he won another Grammy award for Best Historical Album, for his work on Dust-to-Digital's Voices of Mississippi: Artists and Musicians Documented by William Ferris.

Other work 
Graves is also affiliated with the Association for Recorded Sound Collections (ARSC) and the Audio Engineering Society (AES). He is also a board member and technical advisor to Music Memory, an organization dedicated to the preservation of large, rare 78 rpm collections.

Graves is a member of The Recording Academy, and The Recording Academy's Producers & Engineers Wing. He also served multiple terms on the Board of Governors in Atlanta and Los Angeles.

Awards and nominations

Grammy Awards
Graves has won the Grammy Award for Best Historical Album four times, and has been nominated a further nine times.

Wins
It's Such A Good Feeling: The Best Of Mister Rogers (2021)
Voices of Mississippi: Artists and Musicians Documented by William Ferris (2018)
Hank Williams, The Garden Spot Programs, 1950 (2014)
Art Of Field Recording Volume I: Fifty Years Of Traditional American Music Documented By Art Rosenbaum (2008)

Nominations
Blondie, Against The Odds: 1974-1982 (2023)
Excavated Shellac: An Alternate History of the World's Music (2022)
Sweet As Broken Dates: Lost Somali Tapes From The Horn Of Africa (2017)
Washington Phillips And His Manzarene Dreams (2017)
Music Of Morocco From The Library Of Congress: Recorded By Paul Bowles, 1959 (2016)
Parchman Farm: Photographs And Field Recordings, 1947–1959 (2015)
Longing For The Past: The 78 RPM Era In Southeast Asia (2014)
Pictures Of Sound: One Thousand Years Of Educed Audio: 980–1980 (2013)
Opika Pende: Africa At 78 RPM (2012)

Blues Music Award
Graves also won a 2017 Blues Music Award in the category of Historical Album of the Year, for the Bobby Rush box set Chicken Heads: A 50-Year History Of Bobby Rush.

Discography

References

External links
 Osiris Studio official site

1968 births
Grammy Award winners
American audio engineers
Living people